The Ptychopteridae, phantom crane flies, are a small family (three extant genera) of nematocerous Diptera. Superficially similar in appearance to other "tipuloid" families, they lack the ocelli of the Trichoceridae, the five-branched radial vein of the Tanyderidae, and the two anal veins that reach the wing margins of the Tipulidae. They are usually allied with the Tanyderidae based on similarities of the mesonotal suture, this group being called the Ptychopteromorpha.

Life history

Egg
Ptychoptera albimana (Palearctic) has a mean of 554 eggs laid. Duration is reported at 7 days.

Larvae
The larvae are eucephalous and distinctive for the long, caudal respiratory siphon they possess. They occur in moist habitats (described as "wet swales and meadows" for Ptychoptera; along lentic shorelines and alder swamps for Bittacomorpha) where they feed as collector-gatherers on decaying organic matter.

Pupae
The pupae possess a single, greatly elongated spiracular horn protruding from their thoraces. In Ptychoptera and Bittacomorpha, the right horn is elongated; in Bittacomorphella, the left. Reported times spent in this stage vary from 5 to 12 days.

Adult
The adults are found most often from late spring through to autumn in shaded, moist environs. Presumably, adults feed little, if at all. Two generations occur per year.

The common species of Eastern North America (Bittacomorpha clavipes) is known for the odd habit of spreading out its legs while flying, using expanded, trachea-rich tarsi to waft along on air currents.

Why they are called “phantom” crane flies:  Their legs are thin and black with white sheaths near the tips, and when they fly under a shady tree, everything disappears except the white spots, appearing and disappearing like a “phantom”.

Subfamilies
The general appearance of the two forms is strikingly different. The species of the Bittacomorphinae are similar in size and shape to the Tipulidae, but exhibit a striking black and white coloration — hence the common name "phantom crane flies". The two genera differ as adults in their size and the extent of white coloration on the legs. The larvae of Bittacomorphella possess unique protuberances not seen in the other two genera. Ptychoptera species resemble large mycetophilids, being generally a shiny black and often with patterned wings.

Ptychopterinae – 16 antennomeres; M1 cell present
Ptychoptera 
Bittacomorphinae – 20 antennomeres; M1 & M2 veins fused, thus without M1 cell
Bittacomorpha 
Bittacomorphella 

Bittacomorphinae
Bittacomorpha 
Bittacomorpha clavipes  - Eastern NA to the edge of the Rocky Mountains (though not as abundant in the Plains states)
Bittacomorpha occidentalis  - Pacific Northwest
Bittacomorphella 
Bittacomorphella jonesi  - New England down to North Carolina, west to Minnesota and Michigan
Bittacomorphella esakii  - Japan
Bittacomorphella fenderiana  - Queen Charlotte Island down to Northern Oregon.
Bittacomorphella nipponensis  - 
Bittacomorphella pacifica  - Northern California up through Oregon (possibly Washington?)
Bittacomorphella sackenii  - Sierra Nevadas
Bittacomorphella thaiensis  -
Ptychopterinae
Ptychoptera 
Ptychoptera byersi  - California
Ptychoptera lenis 
P. l. lenis - Pacific Northwest 
P. l. coloradensis - Colorado/Utah
Ptychoptera metallica  - Central Canada, Minnesota & Michigan
Ptychoptera minor  - California/Idaho
Ptychoptera monoensis  - Northern California
Ptychoptera osceola  - Florida
Ptychoptera pendula  - British Columbia to Utah & Colorado
Ptychoptera quadrifasciata  - Eastern North America (Syn P. rufocinctus)
Ptychoptera sculleni  - Pacific Northwest
Ptychoptera townesi  - Washington & Oregon
Ptychoptera uta  - Utah

Fossil Subfamilies and genera
 Subfamily Bittacomorphinae 
 †Probittacomorpha  
 †Probittacomorpha brisaci  - Montagne d'Andance Miocene (Turolian), France 
 †Probittacomorpha christenseni  - Fur Formation Eocene (Ypresian), Denmark;
 †Zhiganka 
 †Zhiganka comitans  - Batylykh Formation Early Cretaceous (Neocomian), Russia
 †Zhiganka longialata  - Khasurty locality Early Cretaceous (Aptian), Russia
 †Zhiganka woolgari  - Weald Clay Early Cretaceous (Hauterivian), England
 Subfamily. †Eoptychopterinae 
 †Architendipes 
 †Architendipes tshernovskiji  - Dzhil Formation Early Jurassic (Hettangian), Kyrgyzstan
 †Doptychoptera 
 †Doptychoptera baisica - Zaza Formation Early Cretaceous (Aptian), Russia
 †Eolimnobia 
 †Eolimnobia geinitzi  - Ciechocinek Formation Early Jurassic (Toarcian), Germany
 †Eoptychoptera 
 †Eoptychoptera aequidistans  - Dzhil Formation Early Jurassic (Hettangian), Kyrgyzstan
 †Eoptychoptera altaica  - Ortsog Formation Middle Jurassic (Bajocian), Mongolia
 †Eoptychoptera ansorgei  - Daohugou Formation Middle Jurassic (Callovian), China
 †Eoptychoptera asiatica  - Karabastau Formation Late Jurassic, Kazakhstan
 †Eoptychoptera aucta  - Karabastau Formation Late Jurassic, Kazakhstan
 †Eoptychoptera braziliana  - Crato Formation Early Cretaceous (Aptian), Brazil
 †Eoptychoptera britannica  - Weald Clay Early Cretaceous (Hauterivian), England
 †Eoptychoptera cantabrica  - Spanish amber (Albian), Spain
 †Eoptychoptera cretacea  - Zaza Formation Early Cretaceous (Aptian), Russia
 †Eoptychoptera elevata  - Khaya Formation Late Jurassic (Tithonian), Russia
 †Eoptychoptera eximia  - Ciechocinek Formation Early Jurassic (Toarcian), Germany
 †Eoptychoptera jurassica  - Daohugou Formation Middle Jurassic (Callovian), China
 †Eoptychoptera longifurcata  - Lulworth Formation Early Cretaceous (Berriasian), England
 †Eoptychoptera magna  - Karabastau Formation Late Jurassic, Kazakhstan
 †Eoptychoptera maxima  - Itat Formation Middle Jurassic (Bathonian), Russia
 †Eoptychoptera modica  - Itat Formation (Middle Jurassic (Bathonian), Russia
 †Eoptychoptera paramaculata  - Itat Formation (Middle Jurassic (Bathonian), Russia
 †Eoptychoptera shurabica  - Sagul Formation Early Jurassic (Toarcian), Kyrgyzstan
 †Eoptychoptera simplex  - Ciechocinek Formation Early Jurassic (Toarcian), Germany
 †Eoptychoptera spectra  - Charmouth Mudstone Formation (Sinemurian), United Kingdom
 †Eoptychoptera tempestilla  - Ulan Malgait Formation Late Jurassic (Tithonian), Mongolia
 †Eoptychoptera vitrea  -  Dzhil Formation Early Jurassic (Hettangian), Kyrgyzstan
†Eoptychopterina  
 †Eoptychopterina adnexa  - Daohugou Formation Middle Jurassic (Callovian), China
 †Eoptychopterina angularis  - Karabastau Formation Late Jurassic, Kazakhstan
 †Eoptychopterina antica  - Daohugou Formation Middle Jurassic (Callovian), China
 †Eoptychopterina baisica  - Zaza Formation Early Cretaceous (Aptian), Russia
 †Eoptychopterina camura  - Weald Clay Early Cretaceous (Hauterivian), United Kingdom
 †Eoptychopterina daiensis  - Glushkovo Formation Late Jurassic (Tithonian), Russia
 †Eoptychopterina demissa  - Durlston Formation Early Cretaceous (Berriasian), United Kingdom
 †Eoptychopterina dimidiata  - Durlston Formation Early Cretaceous (Berriasian), United Kingdom
 †Eoptychopterina elenae  - Daohugou Formation Middle Jurassic (Callovian), China
 †Eoptychopterina glabra  - Itat Formation Middle Jurassic (Bathonian), Russia
 †Eoptychopterina kaluginae  - Ulan Malgait Formation Late Jurassic (Tithonian), Mongolia
 †Eoptychopterina karatavica  - Karabastau Formation Late Jurassic, Kazakhstan
 †Eoptychopterina mediata  - Daohugou Formation Middle Jurassic (Callovian), China
 †Eoptychopterina omissa  - Karabastau Formation Late Jurassic, Kazakhstan
 †Eoptychopterina petri  - Glushkovo Formation Late Jurassic (Tithonian), Russia
 †Eoptychopterina postica  - Daohugou Formation Middle Jurassic (Callovian), China
 †Eoptychopterina rohdendorphi  - Ichetuy Formation Late Jurassic (Oxfordian), Russia
 †Eoptychopterina transbaicalica  - Uda Formation Late Jurassic (Oxfordian/Kimmeridgian), Russia
 †Eoptychopterina undensis  - Glushkovo Formation Late Jurassic (Tithonian), Russia
 †Leptychoptera 
 †Leptychoptera subgenus (Burmaptychoptera) 
 †Leptychoptera (Burmaptychoptera) calva   -  Burmese amber Mid Cretaceous (latest Albian-earliest Cenomanian), Myanmar
 †Leptychoptera (Burmaptychoptera) reburra   - Burmese amber Mid Cretaceous (latest Albian-earliest Cenomanian), Myanmar
 †Leptychoptera subgenus (Leptychoptera) 
 †Leptychoptera (Leptychoptera) dimkina  - Lebanese amber Early Cretaceous (Barremian) Lebanon 
 †Leptychoptera (Leptychoptera) vovkina  -  Lebanese amber Early Cretaceous (Barremian) Lebanon
 †Nedoptychoptera 
 †Nedoptychoptera karatavica - Karabastau Formation Late Jurassic, Kazakhstan
 †Neuseptychoptera  
 †Neuseptychoptera carolinensis - Neuse River amber Late Cretaceous (Campanian), North Carolina,
†subfamily Proptychopterininae 
†Proptychopterina 
 †Proptychopterina amota  - Itat Formation Middle Jurassic (Bathonian) Russia
 †Proptychopterina evecta  - Karabastau Formation Late Jurassic Kazakhstan
 †Proptychopterina gracilis  - Karabastau Formation Late Jurassic Kazakhstan
 †Proptychopterina handlirschi  - Itat Formation Middle Jurassic (Bathonian) Russia
 †Proptychopterina immensa  - Khaya Formation Late Jurassic (Tithonian), Russia
 †Proptychopterina makarova  - Makarova Formation Early Jurassic (Toarcian), Russia
 †Proptychopterina mongolica  - Ulaan-Ereg Formation Late Jurassic (Tithonian), Mongolia
 †Proptychopterina oleynikovi  - Glushkovo Formation Late Jurassic (Tithonian), Russia
 †Proptychopterina opinata  -Daohugou Formation Middle Jurassic (Callovian), China
 †Proptychopterina sharategica  - Ulan Malgait Formation Late Jurassic (Tithonian), Mongolia
 †Proptychopterina tenera  - Khaya Formation Late Jurassic (Tithonian), Russia
 †Proptychopterina yeniseica  - Itat Formation Middle Jurassic (Bathonian) Russia
Subfamily Ptychopterinae 
†Brodilka 
 †Brodilka mitchelli  - Lulworth Formation Early Cretaceous (Berriasian) United Kingdom
 Ptychoptera 
 †Ptychoptera deleta  - Cypris Formation (Miocene), Czech Republic
 †Ptychoptera eocenica  - Baltic amber (Priabonian), Russia
 †Ptychoptera mesozoica  - Zaza Formation Early Cretaceous (Aptian), Russia
 †Ptychoptera miocenica  - Florissant Formation (Priabonian), Colorado
 †Sinoptychopterites 
 †Sinoptychopterites paludus  - Fushin amber (Ypresian), China
Subfamily incertae sedis
 †Bolboia 
 †Bolboia mira  -  Byankino Formation Late Jurassic (Tithonian), Russia
 †Crenoptychoptera 
 †Crenoptychoptera antica  - Itat Formation Middle Jurassic (Bathonian) Russia
 †Crenoptychoptera bavarica  - Solnhofen Formation Late Jurassic (Tithonian), Germany
 †Crenoptychoptera conspecta  - Cheremkhovskaya Formation, Early Jurassic (Toarcian), Russia
 †Crenoptychoptera decorosa  - Daohugou Formation Middle Jurassic (Callovian), China
 †Crenoptychoptera defossa  - Itat Formation Middle Jurassic (Bathonian) Russia
 †Crenoptychoptera dobbertinensis  - Ciechocinek Formation Early Jurassic (Toarcian), Germany
 †Crenoptychoptera gronskayae  - Khaya Formation Late Jurassic (Tithonian), Russia
 †Crenoptychoptera liturata  - Ulan Malgait Formation Late Jurassic (Tithonian), Mongolia
 †Etoptychoptera 
 †Etoptychoptera tertiaria  - Allenby Formation (Ypresian), Canada

References

Further reading
Borror, D.J., C.A. Triplehorn, & N.A. Johnson. 1989. An Introduction to the Study of Insects, Sixth edition. Saunders College Publishing.
Byers, G.W. & D.A. Rossman. 2004. Preliminary survey of the crane flies of Louisiana (Diptera: Tipulidae, Ptychopteridae). Proceedings of the Entomological Society of Washington, 106: 884–890.
Stubbs, A.E. 1993. Provisional Atlas of the Ptychopteroid Craneflies (Diptera: Ptychopteridae) of Britain and Ireland. Centre for Ecology and Hydrology.
Zwick, P. 2004. Fauna Europaea: Ptychopteridae. In: Fauna Europaea: Diptera: Nematocera. H. DeJong, ed.

External links
 Catalog of Life
 Bug Guide
Ptychopteridae at Insects of Quebec webpage
Photograph of larva at Troutnut.com website
Diptera.info Gallery
Video

 
Nematocera families